Marc Renier (born 28 March 1953) is a former Belgian racing cyclist. He rode in the 1980 Tour de France.

References

External links

1953 births
Living people
Belgian male cyclists
People from Roeselare
Cyclists from West Flanders